Holiday in Mexico is a 1946 Technicolor musical directed by George Sidney and starring Walter Pidgeon, Jane Powell, and Ilona Massey.

Plot
The film starts with a brief cartoon of telephone wires from Washington, DC trying to call Mexico. Jeffrey Evans (Walter Pidgeon), an American ambassador to Mexico, is the sole parent to his teenage daughter, Christine (Jane Powell). She finds fulfillment in managing her father's life and spending time with him. Her father forces her to attend a party where her childhood friend, Stanley Owen (Roddy McDowall), who has just turned sixteen, awaits her. In revenge she gives Stanley one of her father's expensive, brand-new tobacco pipes. Stanley, thinking that this gift was meant to show that he is finally a man, asks Christine to be "his girl", but she insists that she is too busy for that. Yvette Baranga (Helene Stanley), the daughter of the French ambassador, begs Christine if she can attend Jeffrey Evans' upcoming party. Christine agrees, unaware that Yvette has a crush on her father. When they return home, Christine asks her father to permit her to arrange the party, to which he agrees. The next day, Stanley comes to drive her to her errands. Christine apologizes for being rude to Stanley, and says he doesn't have to drive her, but he takes her to speak with Toni Karpathy (Ilona Massey), who agrees to sing at the party. Unbeknownst to Christine, Toni was once a love interest of her father.

She then goes to meet with the piano virtuoso (Jose Iturbi). He is impressed by her skills of putting his crazy household back into place and comments that her father is lucky to have her, but he is blown away when he hears her sing and asks her to perform in his concert. She declines because she and her father will be leaving to visit her grandmother. The party is a success, however Christine misses half of it because she forgot to get herself ready. Her spirits are lifted when Jose arrives and not only performs, but gives her an expensive corsage. Stanley becomes jealous and argues with Christine.

Through the week, Jeffrey Evans spends more time with Toni. Christine, not knowing what her father is up to, calls Stanley. She has him help sneak her into the evening club to spy on her father. They successfully get past the guards, but Stanley makes a fool of himself by tripping into customers. When Christine sees her father in the club with Toni, she sadly leaves. At home she complains that no one needs her anymore. Stanley says that he needs her, but Christine puts him down saying he has his mother to take care of him. She then remembers what Jose told her and begins to dream of marrying him, though he is decades older than she is. Stanley leaves furious. Later, her father tells her that he won't go to visit Christine's grandmother. Christine also decides to stay so that she can perform in Jose's concert.

Stanley visits Jeffrey and tells him that she is in love with Jose, but her father assures him that it is nothing to be worried about. However, he reconsiders when he sees one of her drawings of Jose. Yvette drops by and Jeffery, thinking she was visiting Christine, asks her if it is possible for a young woman like herself to be interested in an older man. Yvette, believing that he is referring to her, says yes and happily leaves.

Jeffrey goes to see Jose and finds that he is not romantically interested in Christine. The Evans visit Jose and he introduces Christine to his grandchildren. Christine, shocked, returns home and tearfully goes to her room to pack for her grandmother's. Jeffrey tries to follow however he is stopped by the French ambassador, who tries to make arrangements for Yvette to marry Jeffrey. Realizing this situation would take forever resolving, he says he cannot marry Yvette because her dowry is too low. Jeffrey then goes to speak with his daughter and tells her that running away from her problems will not solve them. She stays and performs in the concert while her father, Toni, and Stanley proudly watch her.

Cast

 Walter Pidgeon as Jeffrey Evans
 Jane Powell as Christine Evans
 José Iturbi as himself
 Roddy McDowall as Stanley Owen
 Ilona Massey as Countess Toni Karpathy
 Xavier Cugat as himself
 Hugo Haas as Angus, Evans' butler
 Helene Stanley as Yvette Baranga
 Mikhail Rasumny as Baranga
 William "Bill" Phillips as Sam, Evans' chauffeur
 Amparo Iturbi as herself
 Tonia Hero as Mouse (Iturbi Grandchild)
 Teresa Hero as Mouse (Iturbi Grandchild)
 Fidel Castro as Extra (uncredited)

Soundtrack
 I Think of You
 Music based on Piano Concerto No.2 by Sergei Rachmaninoff
 Music Adaptation and Lyrics by Jack Elliott & Don Marcotte
 Someone to Love
 Music by Paul Abraham
 Lyrics by Ralph Freed
 These Patient Years
 Music by Sammy Fain
 Lyrics by Ralph Freed
 Holiday in Mexico
 Music by Sammy Fain
 Lyrics by Ralph Freed
 You, So It's You
 Music by Nacio Herb Brown
 Lyrics by Earl K. Brent
 And Dreams Remain
 Music by Raoul Soler
 Lyrics by Ralph Freed
 Walter Winchell Rhumba
 Music by Noro Morales
 Yo Te Amo Much - And That's That
 Written by Sam H. Stept, Ervin Drake, Xavier Cugat & Noro Morales
 Piano Concerto No. 2 in C Minor
 Music by Sergei Rachmaninoff
 Polonaise in A Flat, Opus 53
 Music by Frédéric Chopin
 Linda Mujer
 Written by Raphael Duchesne
 Liebestod
 from Tristan und Isolde
 Music by Richard Wagner
 Italian Street Song
 Music by Victor Herbert
 Lyrics by Rida Johnson Young
 Good Night, Sweetheart
 Written by Ray Noble, Jimmy Campbell and Reginald Connelly
 Les filles de Cadiz
 Music by Léo Delibes
 Lyrics by Alfred de Musset
 Csak Egy Szep Lany
 Traditional
 The Music Goes 'Round and 'Round
 Written by Mike Riley, Edward Farley and 'Red' Hodgson
 Three Blind Mice
 Traditional
 Ave Maria
 Music by Franz Schubert

Notes
 This film marked Jane Powell's first picture for MGM at the age of 17
 One of several films in which a young Fidel Castro appears as an extra, mostly in crowd scenes.

Reception
The film earned $3,766,000 in the US and Canada and $1,957,000 elsewhere, leading to a profit of $910,000.

References

Further reading

External links
 
 
 

1946 films
1946 musical comedy films
American musical comedy films
Films directed by George Sidney
Films set in Mexico
Metro-Goldwyn-Mayer films
Films produced by Joe Pasternak
Metro-Goldwyn-Mayer cartoon studio films
1940s English-language films
1940s American films